Marnie Alton is a fitness expert and the Founder and CEO of M/BODY studio and exercise technique. 

She is originally from Alberta Canada, this prairie girl grew up immersed in music, theatre and dance. After graduating from The Canadian College of Performing Arts, she booked a tv show and moved to Los Angeles where she immediately fell in love with both the city and barre fitness: a workout that builds strength and flexibility based on many of the same disciplines she learned as a dancer. She knew this was her new home.

Marnie studied under Bar Method founder Burr Leonard and spent the next 10 years training hundreds of celebrities, athletes and fitness enthusiasts alike. She soon developed her own, unique style and became a leading pioneer and trusted innovator in the barre fitness community. She spent a year developing and refining her new barre technique, and in May 2014 she opened her flagship studio on La Brea in Los Angeles. People have been coming from far and wide ever since.

By combining her grit, knowledge and infectious positive energy, Marnie inspires clients daily to dig deeper than they ever thought possible. She empowers each person to reach their fullest potential in every moment. Marnie believes that feeling powerful, graceful and confident in your own skin is what it’s all about. She created M/BODY formerly known as Barre Belle so people would have a place to call home and do just that.

Marnie previously was an actress and musician. She released a self titled EP in 2010  and is best known for portraying Sam on the Logo series Exes and Ohs.

Filmography

Film

Television

References

External links

Actresses from Edmonton
Canadian LGBT entertainers
Living people
Musicians from Edmonton
Year of birth missing (living people)
Canadian film actresses
Canadian television actresses
LGBT actresses